Vesta is an unincorporated community in Patrick County, Virginia, United States. Vesta has a post office with ZIP code 24177.

References

Unincorporated communities in Patrick County, Virginia
Unincorporated communities in Virginia